Alberta has provincial legislation allowing its municipalities to conduct municipal censuses between April 1 and June 30 inclusive. Municipalities choose to conduct their own censuses for multiple reasons such as to better inform municipal service planning and provision, to capitalize on per capita based grant funding from higher levels of government, or to simply update their populations since the last federal census.

Alberta had 359 municipalities between April 1 and June 30, 2012, up from 358 during the same three-month period in 2011. At least 58 of these municipalities conducted a municipal census in 2012. Alberta Municipal Affairs recognized those conducted by 55 of these municipalities. By municipal status, it recognized those conducted by 8 of Alberta's 17 cities, 23 of 108 towns, 8 of 95 villages, 4 of 51 summer villages, 1 of 5 specialized municipalities, 3 of 64 municipal districts and all 8 Metis settlements. In addition to those recognized by Municipal Affairs, censuses were conducted by the City of St. Albert, the Village of Beiseker and Strathcona County (a specialized municipality).

Some municipalities achieved population milestones as a result of their 2011 censuses. Calgary surpassed 1.1 million while the cities of Leduc and Fort Saskatchewan surpassed the 25,000 and the 20,000 marks respectively. Chestermere, Alberta's fourth-largest town, surpassed 15,000 residents.

Municipal census results 
The following summarizes the results of the numerous municipal censuses conducted in 2012.

Breakdowns

Urban and rural service areas

Strathcona County

Wood Buffalo

Hamlets 
The following is a list of hamlet populations determined by 2012 municipal censuses conducted by Strathcona County and the Regional Municipality (RM) of Wood Buffalo excluding the urban service areas of Fort McMurray and Sherwood Park that are presented above.

Shadow population counts 
Alberta Municipal Affairs defines shadow population as "temporary residents of a municipality who are employed by an industrial or commercial establishment in the municipality for a minimum of 30 days within a municipal census year." The RM of Wood Buffalo conducted a shadow population count in 2012. The following presents the results of this count for comparison with its concurrent municipal census results.

Notes

See also 
List of communities in Alberta
List of municipalities in Alberta

References

External links 
Alberta Municipal Affairs: Municipal Census & Population Lists
Statistics Canada: Census Profile (2011 Census)

Local government in Alberta
Municipal censuses in Alberta
2012 censuses
2012 in Alberta